Bobby Bounds (born January 13, 1969) is a former American football quarterback who played two seasons with the Cleveland Thunderbolts of the Arena Football League (AFL). He played college football at Texas A&M University-Commerce, which was then known as East Texas State University, where he was an All-American quarterback and one of the best passers in the history of Lion football and the Lone Star Conference. He was also a member of the Benicarlo Tifons of the Professional Football League and Shreveport Pirates of the Canadian Football League (CFL).

Early years
Bounds was born in Mesquite, Texas moved to Picayune Mississippi at an early age and was a standout quarterback at Picayune Memorial High School, in the western part of Mississippi.  In his Senior season for the Maroon Tide, Bounds led Picayune to the 5A State Championship. Bounds graduated from PMHS in 1987 and accepted a scholarship to play college football at Texas A&M University-Commerce, then known as East Texas State University.

College career

Freshmen and Sophomore Seasons
Bounds redshirted the 1987 season, and then was a back-up to All-Conference QB and future professional Mike Trigg. He saw his first action during the 1988 season in which the Lions finished 8–3 and second in the Lone Star Conference. Bounds became the starter in 1989 as a sophomore as the Lions finished 4–6 and fifth in the conference. Bounds completed 107 passes out of 198 attempts for 1,521 yards, 8 touchdowns, and 14 interceptions.

Junior Season

Bounds' Junior year the Lions had a massive turnaround as he led ETSU to a Lone Star Conference Championship with a 7–0 record in conference play, the Lions first conference championship since 1983. The Lions also qualified for the NCAA Division II National Playoffs for the first time since joining the NCAA in 1982. The Lions defeated Grand Valley State but then bowed out to eventual national champion Pittsburg State to finish with an overall 10–3 record. Bounds finished season with 1,905 passing yards and 17 touchdowns. He was named First team All Conference, and consensus Offensive Back of the year.

Senior Season

Bounds' Senior season he led the Lions another solid season with an 8–4–1 record and a second-place finish in the conference. He played through injuries and also battled classmate Mike Meador for snaps, however this did not prevent him from being first team all conference for a second straight season and notching All-American honors by Don Hansen's Football Gazette. The Lions qualified for the NCAA playoffs once more, once again defeating Grand Valley State in the first round before bowing out to the Gorillas of Pittsburg State again, a team the Lions had defeated earlier in the season. Bounds left Commerce as the all-time leader in passing yards with 5,955 yards (held record for 27 years) and total offense with 6,369 yards. He graduated from ETSU  with a degree in Kinesiology & Sports Studies. He still holds records for total offense in a career and is second in career passing yards.

Professional career

Bounds was scouted by NFL scouts and the Seattle Seahawks showed interest in signing or drafting him, but Bounds went undrafted. He played for the AFL's Cleveland Thunderbolts during the 1992 and 1993 seasons, starting in 1992. He was a player/coach for the Benicarlo Tifons of The Professional Football League from Spain in 1994. Bounds left the organization after being signed by the Shreveport Pirates of the CFL. He was released by the Pirates in June 1994.

Coaching career
 
 
  1992-1993- GA Texas A&M - Commerce - Quarterback Coach - 
  1995 - Newman Smith HS -  Quarterback Coach - 
  1996-1997 - Marcus HS - Wide Receiver Coach - 1997 Texas 5A State Champions - 
  1998 - Picayune Memorial HS(MS)-  Quarterback Coach - 
  1999-2000 - Gainesville HS - Offensive Coordinator - 
  2001-2002 - Dallas W.T. White HS - Offensive Coordinator - 
  2003 - Dallas Skyline HS - Offensive Coordinator - 
  2004 - Newman Smith HS - Offensive Coordinator - 
  2005-2006 - Newman Smith HS - Head Coach - 
  2006-2020 - Took a break from coaching to Start his own Concrete Construction Companies - (California Construction and BMFB Concrete Contractors)- 
  2020 - Present - Frisco Fighters(IFL) Defense

Personal
Bounds currently resides in Frisco, Texas with his wife Anita Lane-Bounds. He has 2 children. Brinklee Bounds and Brenden Bounds. He is the Owner and President of his own private construction company, BMFB Concrete Construction. He stays active with the A&M-Commerce Football program as a supporter.

References

External links
Just Sports Stats

1969 births
Living people
American football quarterbacks
Texas A&M–Commerce Lions football players
Cleveland Thunderbolts players
Players of American football from Mississippi
People from Picayune, Mississippi